Lešť is a  municipality and a former village in the Zvolen District in the Banská Bystrica Region of Slovakia.

Currently, it is the location of the Lešť military training centre.

References

Villages and municipalities in Zvolen District
Former villages in Slovakia